Norman Eshley (born 30 May 1945) is an English actor best known for his television roles.

Biography
Eshley attended Bristol Grammar School and worked in a bank, before training as an actor at the Bristol Old Vic Theatre School. He played many Shakespearean roles on stage. His first screen role was in the 1968 film The Immortal Story, directed by Orson Welles. He played a lead character, Steve, in Blind Terror (1971) and appeared in the Pete Walker horror film House of Mortal Sin in 1975.

In 1969 Eshley appeared alongside Dudley Sutton in two very similar villainous roles: in the Randall & Hopkirk (Deceased) episode "Could You Recognise the Man Again?", and in the Department S episode, "Handicap Dead". However he is possibly best known for his role in the sitcom George and Mildred (1976–79) as the snobbish, right-wing estate agent Jeffrey Fourmile, the foil to George. In the show's direct predecessor Man About the House (1973–76) he had previously featured in several episodes as Robin Tripp's brother Norman, who married Chrissy (Paula Wilcox)—and he was mentioned in the spin-off show Robin's Nest in the episode "Love and Marriage" as Robin's best man who never turned up to the wedding due to having mumps. In an earlier Man About the House episode "In Praise of Older Men" in 1974 he played a sleazy married executive named Ian Cross who tried to seduce Chrissy. 

In 1985 Eshley played the Reverend Redwood, a benevolent vicar who runs a social club with a view to rehabilitating ex-convicts in the Minder episode, Give Us This Day Arthur Daley's Bread.

His other TV credits include: Thriller ("The Colour of Blood"/US title: "The Carnation Killer", 1973) as an escaped serial killer, Warship (1973–74), The Duchess of Duke Street, I, Claudius, The Sweeney (all 1976), Return of the Saint (1978), a former SAS colleague of Bodie in The Professionals episode  "Kickback" (1980), a vicar in Minder (1985), Taggart (1990), Cadfael (1994), One Foot in the Grave (1997), Dangerfield (1998), and The Bill (1999–2000).

In 1988 he appeared in a public information film about road safety called Accident in Park Road. His character is seen driving a Ford Escort before running over a child who dashes out between cars in front of him. He is questioned by Graham Cole who plays a policeman, a role Cole played as PC Tony Stamp in The Bill.

Along with Douglas Fielding, he provided the narration for the Blind Guardian album Nightfall in Middle-Earth. He had roles in the BBC TV series New Tricks (2007) and A Christmas Campaign (short, 2011). In 2019, he appeared in the documentary The Immortal Orson Welles, directed by Chris Wade.

Personal life

In 1993, Eshley was a passenger in a car which was involved in a crash in the Dordogne in France. He sustained multiple injuries, including head trauma.
Eshley now lives with his wife in Tewkesbury, Gloucestershire, England.

Filmography

Film
 The Immortal Story (1968) – Paul, the sailor
 The Lost Continent (1968) – Jonathan, the Prisoner
 Crossplot (1969) – Athol
 See No Evil (1971) – Steve Reding
 House of Mortal Sin (1976) – Father Bernard Cutler
 The Disappearance (1977) – Young Husband
 George and Mildred (1980) – Jeffrey Fourmile
 Empty Mirror (2000) – Oz Riley
 A Christmas Campaign (2011) - Creative Director 
 The Immortal Orson Welles (2019) - Himself
 Cold Sun (2021) - Head of Counter Terrorism Commander

Television

References

External links
 

Living people
1945 births
English male film actors
English male television actors
People educated at Bristol Grammar School
Male actors from Bristol